Tony Cox is a British record producer and arranger. As such he was influential in late 1960s and 1970s folk rock developments and the fledgling progressive rock scene, and has since worked primarily as a composer and orchestrator.

Career 
He entered the music business as a performer in 1966, and as a duo with Douglas MacRae-Brown released The Young Idea LP in 1967, and had a UK top ten hit single with a cover version of the Lennon-McCartney song "With a Little Help from My Friends". (The album was re-issued on CD in 2009 with previously unreleased tracks.) He continued performing in the studio with various acts he produced such as Trees and Mick Softley. He was an early adopter of the EMS VCS 3 synthesizer and in 1971 played on the Spirogyra album St. Radigunds, and Mike Heron's album Smiling Men With Bad Reputations. In 1972 he played piano with The Bunch alongside Sandy Denny on vocals, and in 1976 he played synth on Martin Carthy's Crown Of Horn LP.

In 1974 he founded Sawmills Studios in Cornwall, one of the first residential recording studios in the UK.

In 1978 he married the singer-songwriter Lesley Duncan, and produced her single "The Magic's Fine". In 1979 produced and arranged the charity single "Sing Children Sing" for the International Year of the Child. In 1982 he produced Duncan's cover version of Bob Dylan's 'Masters of War' single. In 1996 they moved to the Isle of Mull, Scotland.

From 1988 to 1990 he worked for Andrew Lloyd Webber's Really Useful Group as music supervisor, overseeing various shows.

Recently Cox has been composing 'Protomodal' music for instrumental ensemble, creating a uniquely distinctive sound by utilizing unusual modal scales and unorthodox harmonies, mixing rigid composition rules with John Cage like chance elements.

Credits

Producer 
 Caravan
 Mick Softley (arranger)
 Tír na nÓg
 Magna Carta (arranger)
 Trees (arranger)
 Françoise Hardy (arranger)
 Mick Greenwood (arranger)
 Amory Kane

Arranger and orchestrator 
 Family
 Yes
 Renaissance
 John and Beverley Martyn

References 

 The Young Idea LP, at Discogs.com Retrieved 5 November 2016.
 The Young Idea, on officialcharts.com Retrieved 5 November 2016.
 Electric Eden: Unearthing Britain's Visionary Music, by Rob Young. 
 The Young Idea CD liner notes by Stefan Granados
 The Great British Recording Studios, by Howard Massey. 
 Mick Softley CD Retrieved 5 November 2016.
 credits on Allmusic.com Retrieved 5 November 2016.

External links 
 Official website
 'The Young Idea' singles on 45Cat
 Tony Cox on Discogs

Place of birth missing (living people)
Year of birth missing (living people)
Living people
English record producers
The Bunch members